The Ar-Rahman Mosque is a mosque in Pyongyang, North Korea on the grounds of the Iranian embassy, and is considered the country's first and only mosque. Embassy staff from other Islamic countries in North Korea including Sunni from Indonesia have been reported to visit the mosque and pray at it, and the mosque hosts Friday prayers which have been reported to be attended by Muslim embassy staff from various countries regardless of sect. 

Though other Islamic-majority nations have embassies in North Korea, such as Egypt, Libya and Pakistan, none of them have been reported to have mosques on their premises, and the lack of mosques in North Korea due to the state's religious policy has made North Korea reportedly the only country to have only a Shia mosque and no Sunni mosques. However, Armenia also has the Blue Mosque in Yerevan, the only active mosque in the country, making Armenia and North Korea the only two countries to have a single active Shia mosque and no other active Sunni mosques.

References 

Mosques in North Korea
2013 establishments in North Korea
Shia mosques
Iran–North Korea relations